Jabalpur railway division is one of the three railway divisions under West Central Railway zone (WCR) of Indian Railways. This railway division was formed on 1 April 1952 and its headquarters are located at Jabalpur city in the state of Madhya Pradesh of India. It has 107 railway stations under its jurisdiction. Bhopal railway division and Kota railway division are the other two railway divisions under WCR Zone headquartered at Jabalpur.

Jurisdiction
The jurisdiction of Jabalpur division is as follows:
 Manikpur (excluding) to Itarsi (excluding) & Satna (including) - Rewa (including) on Howrah-Mumbai route.
 Bina (Excluding) to Katni (including) on Delhi-Jabalpur route.
 Katni (including) to Singrauli (excluding) on Jabalpur-Howrah route.

List of railway stations and towns 
The list includes the three stations under the Jabalpur railway division and their station category.

Tourist places
Jabalpur Railway Division provides rail connectivity to "Kanha Kisli", "Bandhavgarh" and "Pench" tiger reserves and national parks. Dhuan-Dhar waterfall of Bhera-ghat is located nearly 20 km from Jabalpur city.

References

See also
Jabalpur Division on Twitter

 
Divisions of Indian Railways
1952 establishments in India

Transport in Jabalpur